Silsbee is a former settlement in Imperial County, California.

A post office operated at Silsbee from 1902 to 1909. The name honors Thomas Silsbee, rancher. The town was destroyed by an overflow of the Colorado River.

References

Former settlements in Imperial County, California
Former populated places in California
Destroyed towns
1902 establishments in California